Meldert can refer to the following places:

Meldert, Limburg, borough of Lummen, province of Limburg, Belgium
Meldert, East Flanders, borough of Aalst, province of East Flanders, Belgium
Meldert, Flemish Brabant, borough of Hoegaarden, province of Flemish Brabant, Belgium